Ivan Georgiev Zafirov (born 30 December 1947) is a former Bulgarian footballer who played as a defender.

Career
After short spells at Sliven, it was with CSKA Sofia that he found his spiritual home in the 1970s. Zafirov, a right-back, played 340 times for the Reds, scoring 8 goals. Nine Bulgarian championships and five Bulgarian Cups tell the tale of how successful Zafirov was. 

Zafirov was on Bulgaria's roster for the 1974 FIFA World Cup. He represented the Lions 50 times, scoring once. He also won a silver medal at the 1968 Summer Olympics.

References

1947 births
Living people
Footballers from Sofia
Bulgarian footballers
Bulgaria international footballers
PFC CSKA Sofia players
OFC Sliven 2000 players
First Professional Football League (Bulgaria) players
1974 FIFA World Cup players
Footballers at the 1968 Summer Olympics
Olympic footballers of Bulgaria
Olympic silver medalists for Bulgaria
Olympic medalists in football
Medalists at the 1968 Summer Olympics
Association football defenders